Ek Hota Vidushak is a 1992 Marathi film directed by Jabbar Patel and produced by National Film Development Corporation of India. The film stars Laxmikant Berde, Madhu Kambikar, Nilu Phule, Varsha Usgaonkar in lead roles and Mohan Agashe and Dilip Prabhavalkar in supporting roles.

The film portrays the life of folk theater artist and is considered one of the few films made on the life of tamasha artistes, including Pinjara (1972) and Natarang (2010). Laxmikant Berde, who is better known for his comic roles in Marathi and Hindi films, was appreciated for his role as Aburao. The film is based on a short story written by Jabbar Patel with screenplay and dialogues penned by the veteran Marathi writer, P. L. Deshpande (Pu. La.) after a hiatus of 39 years. Previously, Deshpande had written screenplay and dialogues for another Marathi film Gulacha Ganapati (1953) starring himself.

The film won several awards and was adjudged as the Best Film at Maharashtra State Film Awards (1993). It also won two National Film Awards at the 40th National Film Awards (1992); Best Feature Film in Marathi and Best Choreography for Laxmibai Kolhapurkar. Kolhapurkar became the first choreographer and the first woman to win the National Film Award for choreography. The film also participated at the Indian Panorama, International Film Festival of India in 1993.

Plot

Film begins with Aburao (Laxmikant Berde), a famous film-star in Maharashtra, performing death rituals (Śrāddha) for his mother, Manjula (Madhu Kambikar) in his hometown Begadewadi. As these rituals are usually performed with the shaved head, Aburao is forced to do it by wearing a wig so that he does not lose on the continuity of his films currently being shot. To capture on his popularity, rituals are also being covered by media. Exasperated with media attention, Aburao leaves the crematory and heads towards his mother's home, only to revisit his childhood memories.

Film unfolds in flashback with Aburao, an illegitimate son of a tamasha dancer, Manjula. She left her dancing troupe and eventually became a mistress of a politician-landlord, Himmatrao Inamdar (Mohan Agashe). But sudden death of Inamdar forces Manjula and Aburao to join back the dance troupe; this time her sister Kausalya's troupe. While Manjula is being mentored by Nana (Nilu Phule), young Aburao gets fascinated by Nana's ability to make people laugh and aspires to be a "Songadya" (Clown) like him.

Now grown up Aburao learns mimicry, singing and becomes famous for his political satirical jokes in the tamasha world. Once Aburao's school friend Gunawant (Dilip Prabhavalkar), who has now become a minister, attends his show. Amused by Aburao and his team's performance, Gunawant advises Aburao to form his own tamasha troupe. Following the advice, Aburao forms a new troupe along with Manjula and Nana. On achieving the success of 500th show, Aburao invites Gunawant for the felicitation program. Gunawant is also accompanied by film-star Menaka (Varsha Usgaonkar). She enjoys the performance and advises Aburao to join film industry. Initially reluctant Aburao gets convinced by Menaka and her associates in the industry.

Having thought of doing only one film, Aburao eventually gets attracted towards fame and Menaka and leaves behind his troupe along with his pregnant girlfriend, Subhadra (Pooja Pawar). Eventually Menaka and Aburao get married but then soon he realizes that Menaka married him only to get away from her boyfriend Ravi (Tushar Dalvi). She also unknowingly confesses that she loves "Songadya" (Clown) in Aburao more than Aburao himself as clown diverts her attention from all the worries and bad past she had. Years later Nana visits Aburao along with a small girl, Jaai. Nana informs Aburao that Subhadra has died. He also reveals Jaai to be Aburao's own daughter from Subhadra and tells a strange thing about her that she has never smiled till date. Nana also requests Aburao to take care of Jaai henceforth. Aburao takes Jaai home which leads to clashes with Menaka and him. Menaka decides to leave Aburao to elope with Ravi.

Over a period of time, Aburao tries all his tricks to make Jaai smile but she does not responds to any of them. She tells him that she expects a simple fairy tale from him like any other father would tell to his kid than his fun-making stories which makes other people happy and not her. Gunawant, chief minister now, convinces Aburao to join politics. Gaining the popularity as a politician, Aburao starts defying his own principles till Nana revisits him and reminds of his ethical responsibilities. Gunawant, on the other hands, wants to utilize Aburao and medicates to have him performed in the election rally. Suddenly Aburao gets the heart attack because of the given medication and also notices Jaai in the audience. Having realized this, he changes his speech into a fairy tale which upsets the audience. Everybody leaves except Aburao and Jaai to have their story finished which he narrates as a pure tale of joy. This makes Jaai smile and laugh. Aburao also becomes happy to realize the true meaning of love in the life.

Cast

 Laxmikant Berde as Aburao or Songadya
 Madhu Kambikar as Manjula Devgaonkar, Aburao's mother
 Usha Naik as Background Dancer
 Nilu Phule as Nana, Aburao's mentor
 Varsha Usgaonkar as Menaka
 Mohan Agashe as Himmatrao Inamdar
 Dilip Prabhavalkar as Gunwant, Chief Minister
Tushar Dalvi as Ravi
 Pooja Pawar as Subhadra
 Aseem Deshpande as Young Aburao
 Himani Padhye as Jaai
 Sayaji Shinde as master
 Satish Tare as tamasha Group member

Awards

Maharashtra State Film Awards

The film was adjudged as Best Marathi Film at the 1993 Maharashtra State Film Awards and also won more five awards.

 Best Marathi Film
 Best Screenplay for Pu. La. Deshpande
 Best Lyrics for N. D. Mahanor
 Best Choreography for Laxmibai Kolhapurkar
 Best Male Playback Singer for Ravindra Sathe for the song "Mee Gaatana Geet Tula Ladiwala"
 Best Script for Jabbar Patel

National Film Awards

The film won two National Film Awards at the 40th National Film Awards, awarded for the feature films released in 1992.

 National Film Award for Best Feature Film in Marathi
Citation - For its humane portrait of simple tamash clown sucked in by the glittering world of show business and exploited by politicians.
 National Film Award for Best Choreography - Laxmibai Kolhapurkar
Citation - For successfully adapting a popular folk theatre form to the screen.

Soundtrack

The film soundtrack consists of 22 songs and was released on Fountain Music. Being a Tamasha oriented film, soundtrack primarily consists of songs based on Lavani. The music of the film is composed by veteran music director Anand Modak with the songs rendered by noted playback singers Asha Bhosle, Ravindra Sathe and Devaki Pandit. Poet and songwriter N. D. Mahanor (Na. Dho. Mahanor) who is known for his folk songs in Jait Re Jait (1977) has penned the lyrics.

References

External links

1992 films
Films about musical theatre
1990s Marathi-language films
Films featuring a Best Choreography National Film Award-winning choreography
Best Marathi Feature Film National Film Award winners
National Film Development Corporation of India films
Films directed by Jabbar Patel